Operation Badr may refer to:
 Operation Badr (1973), the highly successful Egyptian crossing of the Bar-Lev Line in the Yom Kippur War
 Operation Badr (1985), an unsuccessful Iranian operation in the Iran-Iraq War
 Operation Badr (1999) or Kargil War, a conflict between India and Pakistan
 Operation Badr (2011) 2011 Taliban offensive